The Hunter 40.5, also referred to as the Legend 40.5, is an American sailboat that was designed by the Hunter Design Team as a cruiser and first built in 1991.

Production
The design was built by Hunter Marine in the United States from 1991 to 1997, but it is now out of production.

Design
The Hunter 40.5 is a recreational keelboat, built predominantly of fiberglass. It has a fractional sloop B&R rig, a slightly raked stem, a walk-through reverse transom with a swimming platform and folding ladder, an internally mounted spade-type rudder controlled by a wheel and a fixed wing keel. It displaces  and carries  of ballast.

Factory standard equipment included a 130% roller furling genoa, four two-speed self tailing winches, anodized spars, marine VHF radio, knotmeter, depth sounder, AM/FM radio and CD player with four speakers, anchor roller, hardwood cabin sole, fully enclosed head with shower, private forward and aft cabins, a dinette table that converts to a berth, complete set of kitchen dishes, microwave oven, dual stainless steel sinks, three-burner gimbaled liquid petroleum gas stove and oven and life jackets. Factory options included air conditioning and a mast furling mainsail.

The design has a PHRF racing average handicap of 108 with a high of 120 and low of 102.

See also
List of sailing boat types

Similar sailboats
C&C 40
CS 40
Columbia 40
Hunter 40
Hunter 41
Marlow-Hunter 40

References

External links
Official brochure

Keelboats
1990s sailboat type designs
Sailing yachts
Sailboat type designs by Hunter Design Team
Sailboat types built by Hunter Marine